The SS United Victory was the first of 531 Victory ships built during World War II under the Emergency Shipbuilding program. She was launched by the Oregon Shipbuilding Corporation on 12 January 1944, completed on 28 February 1944, and had her maiden voyage a month later. The ship's United States Maritime Commission designation was VC2-S-AP3, hull number 85. The Maritime Commission turned her over to a civilian contractor, the American President Lines, for operation until the end of hostilities.

World War II
During World War II she served in the Pacific War, participating in the battle of Okinawa from 10 April 1945 to 19 April 1945. She used her deck guns to defend against attacking kamikaze aircraft while providing logistics support for the invasion of Okinawa. Some of the United States Navy Armed Guards were wounded when the ship was damaged on 16 April 1945, but there was no loss of life.

Postwar service 
United Victory was purchased by Furness Withy in 1946 and renamed Khedive Ismail after Isma'il Pasha. After refitting as an 8196-GRT 78-passenger cargo liner, she began service between Alexandria and New York City on 15 March 1948. She was renamed Cleopatra in 1956, but service to New York ended when she was nationalized by the United Arab Maritime Company in 1961. She was acquired by the Egyptian Navigation Company in 1974, and scrapped at the Gadani ship-breaking yard in 1981.

Honors
Crew of Naval Armed Guard on the SS United Victory''' earned "Battle Stars" in World War II for war action during the assault occupation of Okinawa from 10 April 1945 to 19 April 1945. She used her deck guns to defend herself and other ship in action.

Notes

Sources
Sawyer, L.A. and W.H. Mitchell. Victory ships and tankers: The history of the 'Victory' type cargo ships and of the tankers built in the United States of America during World War II'', Cornell Maritime Press, 1974, 0-87033-182-5.
United States Maritime Commission: 
Victory Cargo Ships 

Victory ships
Ships built in Portland, Oregon
Merchant ships of the United States
1944 ships
World War II merchant ships of the United States